Monolith is a novel by John Passarella set in the fictional universe of the U.S. television series Angel. Tagline:'The two in opposition must agree.'

Plot summary
Like other parents, Angel wishes he could understand his son, Connor. But father-son bonding time is short because Angel is overworked, Connor is embarrassed by his father's blood-drinking, Hyconian demons are running rampant across L.A. - and a huge monolith suddenly appears on Hollywood Boulevard.

Nobody understands this massive rock. It has two demon faces carved into it. The news stations assume it is a clever publicity stunt for a newly released movie, and religious extremists worry that it might be a sign of the impending apocalypse. As the staff of Angel Investigations tries to understand what the rock means, it soon becomes clear that Connor and Angel will have to work together for survival.

Characters include: Angel, Cordelia, Wesley, Gunn, Fred, Lorne and Connor.

Continuity

Supposed to be set in Angel season 4. It is specifically placed between "Spin the Bottle" and "Apocalypse, Nowish".

Canonical issues

Angel books such as this one are not usually considered by fans as canonical. Some fans consider them stories from the imaginations of authors and artists, while other fans consider them as taking place in an alternative fictional reality. However unlike fan fiction, overviews summarising their story, written early in the writing process, were 'approved' by both Fox and Joss Whedon (or his office), and the books were therefore later published as officially Buffy/Angel merchandise.

External links
Cityofangel.com - Interview with author, John Passarella about the book, Monolith

Reviews
Teen-books.com - Reviews of this book

2004 American novels
2004 fantasy novels
Angel (1999 TV series) novels